The Durango Micropolitan Statistical Area is a United States Census Bureau defined Micropolitan Statistical Area located in the Durango area of the State of Colorado.  The Durango Micropolitan Statistical Area is defined as La Plata County, Colorado.  The Micropolitan Statistical Area had a population of 43,941 at the 2000 Census. A July 1, 2009 U.S. Census Bureau estimate placed the population at 51,464.

The Durango Micropolitan Statistical Area includes the City of Durango, the Town of Bayfield, the Town of Ignacio, and the unincorporated areas of La Plata County.

See also:  U.S. Micropolitan Statistical Areas, Durango, Colorado, La Plata County, Colorado, and the Metropolitan Areas of Colorado.

See also
La Plata County, Colorado
Colorado census statistical areas
Colorado metropolitan areas
Combined Statistical Area
Core Based Statistical Area
Metropolitan Statistical Area
Micropolitan Statistical Area
Table of United States Combined Statistical Areas
Table of United States Metropolitan Statistical Areas
Table of United States Micropolitan Statistical Areas
Table of United States primary census statistical areas

References

External links

Micropolitan areas of Colorado